To All the Boys: P.S. I Still Love You (Music from the Netflix Film) is the soundtrack album to the 2020 American film To All the Boys: P.S. I Still Love You. It was released on February 7, 2020 by Capitol Records. The soundtrack's release was simultaneous with the distribution of two singles: "About Love" by Welsh singer Marina and "As I'll Ever Be" by American singer Chaz Cardigan. Ashe's 2019 single "Moral of the Story" was featured on the soundtrack and became a sleeper hit after its inclusion in the film, reaching the top 40 in several countries.

Singles 
"About Love" by Welsh singer and songwriter Marina was first mentioned on January 29, 2020, in a press release for the film. It was released as the soundtrack's lead single for digital download and streaming in various countries on February 7, 2020 through Capitol Records. In Belgium, the song reached number 38 on the Ultratop Top 50 chart on February 28, 2020. Four days later, a promotional lyric video was uploaded to Capitol Records' YouTube channel, which was produced and directed by Filipino artist Bianca Nicdao, and animated by Goldmond Fong.

The soundtrack's second single, "As I'll Ever Be" by American singer Chaz Cardigan, was also released on February 7, 2020.

Track listing

Credits and personnel

Personnel 
Credits adapted from the film's press release.
 Michael Fimognariexecutive producer
 Matt Kaplanexecutive producer
 Laura Webbproducer
 Lindsay Wolfingtonproducer

Production 
Credits adapted from Spotify.

 Daniel Anglisterproducer 
 Allegra Ankaproducer 
 Bad Childproducer 
 Richard Bynonproducer 
 Captain Cutsproducer 
 Noah Conradproducer 
 Joseph E-Shineproducer 
 Illeniumproducer 
 Augusta Kochproducer 
 Gil Landauproducer 
 Jeremy Lutitoproducer 
 Casey Marshallproducer 
 Matias Moraproducer 
 Davis Naishproducer 
 Daniel Nigroproducer 
 Finneas O'Connellproducer 
 Rob Oberdorferproducer 
 Kelly Olsenproducer 
 OTRproducer 
 Sophie Paytenproducer 
 Tim Perryproducer 
 Evan Railtonproducer 
 Rock Mafiaproducer 
 Sofi Tukkerproducer 
 Alex Somersproducer 
 Shimo Talproducer 
 Ukiyoproducer 
 Ori Winokurproducer 
 Karl Zineproducer

Release history

References 

2020 soundtrack albums
Capitol Records soundtracks